Kyle Antony Dixon (born 1994) is an English footballer who plays for Belper Town as a midfielder.

Career
Born in Nottingham, Dixon started a two-year scholarship in 2011 with Notts County. He made his professional debut on 4 September 2012, in a 2–1 victory over Scunthorpe United in the Football League Trophy, replacing Joss Labadie as a substitute. He left Notts County by mutual consent in February 2015. In 2020, Dixon joined Basford United F.C.

On 3 June 2021, Dixon joined Gainsborough Trinity.

Career statistics

References

1994 births
Footballers from Nottingham
Living people
English footballers
Association football midfielders
Notts County F.C. players
Grantham Town F.C. players
Boston United F.C. players
AFC Telford United players
North Ferriby United A.F.C. players
Coalville Town F.C. players
Basford United F.C. players
Gainsborough Trinity F.C. players
English Football League players
National League (English football) players